Poljakovia is a genus of flowering plants belonging to the family Asteraceae.

Its native range is northern China. It is found in China north-central, (Beijing, Gansu, Hebei, Shaanxi, Shandong, Shanxi and Tianjin), Inner Mongolia and Xinjiang. 

The genus name of Poljakovia is in honour of Petr Petrovich Poljakov (1902–1974), a Russian botanist, who was a specialist in Asteraceae and sub-Siberian plants. 
It was first described and published in Novosti Sist. Vyssh. Rast. Vol.33 on page 226 in 2001.

Known species
According to Kew:
Poljakovia alashanensis 
Poljakovia kaschgarica

References

Asteraceae
Asteraceae genera
Plants described in 2001
Flora of North-Central China
Flora of Inner Mongolia
Flora of Xinjiang